The Liverpool and North Wales Steamship Company (LNWSC) was a pleasure cruise company based in Liverpool.

Foundation
In 1890, the Glasgow-based Fairfield Shipbuilding and Engineering Company had formed the New North Wales Steamship Company (NNWSS). The pleasure cruiser market was quickly changing, and bigger boats meant cheaper prices, and hence higher profits. The NNWSS operated its first season with the new Fairfield-built St Tudno, far bigger than any rival vessel on that run.

As a result, in 1891 the NNWSS took over the rival Liverpool, Llandudno and Welsh Coast Steam Boat Company (LL&WC) to form the LNWSC. The original St Tudno was sold to Germany, but along with the older and smaller LL&WC steamers was replaced by the brand new St Tudno, which became the first ship to run under LNWSC colours.

The flag of the LNWSC was white swallowtail, bearing a blue cross throughout, with three gold-coloured ostrich feathers in the form of the Fleur-de-Lys in the centre.

In 1899, the company took over the smaller Snowdon Passenger Steamboat Company (SPSC), which had started in 1892.

Operations
The company's main route was as described in their name: Liverpool, Holyhead, Llandudno and the Menai Straits piers of Beaumaris and Bangor. The company's largest ships operated this route. They also operated services north to Fleetwood, west to the Isle of Man, and around the Isle of Anglesey.

Cessation
Along with other pleasure steamer companies, the LNWSC suffered from the excursion market’s decline starting in the 1950s, due to competition from the motor bus and later the motor car.

The company went into voluntary liquidation at the end of the 1962 season. The receiver immediately sold the St Seiriol for scrap in November 1962, followed by St Tudno in April 1963. The St Trillo was sold to rival P and A Campbell, who continued to run excursions from Llandudno until the 1970s.

Legacy

Services from Liverpool to Llandudno, and Llandudno to Douglas were taken over by the Isle of Man Steam Packet Company, at a reduced frequency. The coastal pleasure steamer MV Balmoral regularly operated summer pleasure cruises on the same routes as the LNWSC, but was taken out of service in 2017.

In the 1990s, a series of early films were rediscovered from Mitchell and Kenyon, who had filmed LNWSC vessels on trips between Liverpool, Holyhead and Llandudno, featuring the St.Tudno and St. Elvies.

Revival in 2016

In 2016 the Liverpool & North Wales Steamship Company Ltd was formed, with the aim of re-introducing pleasure cruises to Liverpool and the North Wales coast. Restoration began on a 1959-built motor vessel and additional purchases were planned. Restoration of the ferry, renamed TSMV Endeavour, was well underway in May 2019  when it sank at its moorings in Canada Dock, following a suspected break-in. Shortly afterwards, the company's social media accounts were removed and their accounts are overdue as of May 2021.

Fleet
The fleet was supplied direct from the Govan yards of Fairfield, where vessels had either been freshly built or heavily refurbished, and where winter maintenance was also undertaken.

The paddle steamer St Elvies was introduced in 1896, mainly deployed on excursions on the Isle of Man route. After the purchase of the SPSC in 1899, she was joined by their paddle steamer Snowdon. In the 1904 season, the expensive La Marguerite was transferred from the Thames Estuary services, operating from Liverpool on the main route until the end of the 1925 season.

After this point, steam turbine vessels began to be deployed. The first steam turbine vessel to be built for the LNWSC was 1914s St Seiriol, but she was lost during World War I, when all commercial services had been suspended. Hence the St Tudno in 1925 became the first turbine vessel, with a second similar but smaller version also called St Seiriol joining in 1931. In the mid-1930s the small diesel-powered St Silio joined the fleet, renamed St Trillo after World War II, again when commercial services were suspended.

Fleet details

References

External links
Postcards of the Liverpool & North Wales Steamship Company
Photos of St Tudno
1959 photo of St Tudno leaving Llandudno

Companies established in 1890
Companies disestablished in 1963
Defunct shipping companies of the United Kingdom
Menai Strait
Defunct companies based in Liverpool